Bloomberg may refer to:

People
 Daniel J. Bloomberg (1905–1984), audio engineer
 Georgina Bloomberg (born 1983), professional equestrian
 Michael Bloomberg (born 1942), American businessman and founder of Bloomberg L.P.; politician and mayor of New York City (2002–2013)
 Ramon Bloomberg (born 1972), American artist and film director

Other uses 
 Bloomberg L.P., financial news and media company founded by Michael Bloomberg
 Bloomberg News, a news agency
 Bloomberg Businessweek, weekly business magazine and website
 Bloomberg Markets, a monthly financial magazine
 Bloomberg Radio, a business radio network
 Bloomberg Television, a business news channel
Bloomberg TV Canada
Bloomberg TV Philippines
Bloomberg TV Malaysia
 Bloomberg Terminal, desktop terminal and software widely used in the financial industry
 Bloomberg Data, API product using sftp or web service protocols to retrieve market data
 Bloomberg Government, online news service covering governmental affairs
 Bloomberg Law, an online legal research service
 Bloomberg Tower, a skyscraper in New York City containing the headquarters of Bloomberg L.P.
 Bloomberg Beta, an independent venture capital firm founded by Bloomberg L.P.
 Bloomberg Philanthropies, American foundation
 Bloomberg Tradebook, agency broker of Bloomberg L.P.
 Bloomberg Global Identifier (BBGID), an open standard, unique identifier of securities
 Bloomberg Commodity Index (BCOM), a broadly diversified commodity price index distributed by Bloomberg Indexes
 Johns Hopkins Bloomberg School of Public Health, part of Johns Hopkins University in Baltimore, Maryland, United States

See also 
 Blomberg (disambiguation)
 Blumberg